Bhandup is a railway station on the Central line of the Mumbai Suburban Railway network. A few fast trains stop at Bhandup station, mostly during the peak hours.

History
Bhandup's relationship with trains goes back to the very earliest times, for it was during a visit to Bhandup in 1843 that George Clark, Chief Engineer to the Bombay Government, first had the idea of linking Mumbai to Thane by railway. The Great Indian Peninsula Railway Company ran its first train on 16 April 1853.

References

Railway stations in India opened in 1853
Railway stations in Mumbai Suburban district
Mumbai Suburban Railway stations
Mumbai CR railway division